The 2023 Fehérvár Enthroners season is the first season of the Fehérvár Enthroners in the European League of Football for the 2023 season, after participating in the second tier of the Austrian Football League last season. There they went unbeaten till the Division 1 championship and also winning the Hungarian state championship.

Preseason
The front office and the core team from last season was mainly kept together, re-signing with head coach Jaime Hill and his team. The first signing of players was Jebrai Regan, also being member of the squad in the year prior. After finding their starting quarterback in Gabriel Cunningham, coming from the Leipzig Kings, the Enthroners signed Anthony Rodriguez from the Barcelona Dragons

Regular season

Standings

Roster

Staff

Notes

References 

Fehérvár Enthroners seasons
Fehérvár Enthroners
Fehérvár Enthroners